Evangeline Gooch (born 15 October 1995) is an Australian rules footballer playing for the West Coast Football Club in the AFL Women's (AFLW). Gooch was drafted by Fremantle with their second selection and tenth overall in the 2017 AFL Women's draft.

She made her debut for West Coast in round 1 of the 2022 season, against Fremantle.

In 2015–16 Gooch was a reserve goalkeeper for the Perth Glory soccer team. She was an unused substitute in five matches.

References

External links 

1995 births
Living people
Fremantle Football Club (AFLW) players
Australian rules footballers from Western Australia
Women's association football goalkeepers
Australian women's soccer players
Perth Glory FC (A-League Women) players
Footballers who switched code
West Coast Eagles (AFLW) players